Braker is a 1985 American made-for-television crime drama film starring Carl Weathers and Joseph Bottoms in the main roles. It was intended as a pilot for a series which was never produced. It was broadcast on ABC on April 28, 1985.

Plot
A seasoned cop and his inexperienced partner investigate a murder involving the music and adult-film industries.

Cast 
Carl Weathers as Lieutenant Harry Braker
Joseph Bottoms as Eddie Kelso
Anne Schedeen as Lieutenant Polly Peters
Alex Rocco as Orsini
Randall 'Tex' Cobb as R.E. Packard
Peter Michael Goetz as Captain Joyce
Dann Florek as Hayes
Tracey Ross as Janice
Shanna Reed as Dede Drummond
Ed O'Neill as Danny Buckner
Ian McShane as Alan Roswell
Kristoffer Tabori as Bruce Wines
Gwen Humble as Kate Taylor
Robert Pastorelli as Forensics Specialist
Enrique Castillo as Booker

References

External links

1985 television films
1985 films
1985 crime drama films
American crime drama films
Films scored by Brad Fiedel
Films about pornography
Television pilots not picked up as a series
Television films as pilots
American drama television films
1980s English-language films
1980s American films